Fruela or Froila is a masculine given name of Gothic origin used in Spain in the Middle Ages. The form "Froila" is that which appears in Latin inscriptions and documents, while "Fruela" is the Old Spanish form. For historical persons, the forms are largely interchangeable. The variant Froilán is of the same origin, but derives from the Latin oblique case form Froilane. The feminine forms of the name, Froileuva (Froiliuba) or Froilana, were rarer. The patronymic derived from Froila is Fróilaz (or Froilaz).

Numerous variations on the name occur in medieval sources. From western Iberia: Froilla, Froyla, Froilo, Froia, Froiam, Frogila, Froiano, Froilarius, Froilatius, Froilano. From eastern Iberia: Foilani, Fraula, Friulano, Frodane, Froilane, Froilani, Froilus, Frolani, Frolia, Froylane, Froylano, Froylus, Frua, Fruao, Fruglane, Fruila, Fruilane, Fruilanus, Fruilla, Frula, Frulla, Fuila.

It may refer to:
Froia (fl. 653), Gothic count
Fruela of Cantabria (d. c. 758), Gothic nobleman
Fruela I of Asturias, king, r. 757–68
Fruela (usurper), king, r. 866
Froila (bishop of Lugo), r. 875–83
Fruela II of Asturias, king, r. 910–25
Froia (bishop of Vic),  r. 957–72
Froila Arias, 11th-century nobleman
Froila Muñoz, 11th-century nobleman
Froila Vermúdez de Traba, 11th-century nobleman
Fruela Díaz (d. 1119), nobleman
Froila Ramírez (d. 1203), nobleman

See also
Froiliuba (fl. 737), queen of King Favila of Asturias
King Froila, a character in the opera Alfonso und Estrella (1822)

References

Given names